TellStar was the first graphical astronomy program available for personal computers.  It was sold from 1980-1986 by Scharf Software Services, originally for the Apple II then later for IBM PC compatibles. It came in two versions: Level 1, which only plotted the Northern Hemisphere; and Level 2, which was able to plot the entire sky.

TellStar could predict the position of celestial objects on any point of the earth at any time between 0 and 3000AD. Available celestial objects were planets, Messier objects, and stars from 3 different catalogs, totaling to over 600 entries.

Plots could be done in 9 directions, N, NE, E, SE, S, SW, W, NW and overhead (a view upwards the sky). Clicking on a star with a joystick or gamepad would give detailed information on each object, including declination, right ascension, magnitude, rising and setting times in sidereal time and Universal Time, and ranges of the year of visibility.

References

External links
Virtual Apple 2 - Online disk archive -- Tellstar

Astronomy software
Apple II software